Revenge of the Virgins is a 1959 American nudie cutie film directed by Peter Perry Jr with a screenplay by Ed Wood.

Plot 
The film involves a main plot about an entrepreneur leading an expedition to find gold and a subplot about a tribe of women.

Cast 
 Charles Veltmann Jr as Melvin Potter
 Jodean Lawrence as Ruby Potter
 Stanton Pritchard as Pan Taggart – the Gold Prospector
 Hank Delgado as Bartender
 Louis Massad as Mike Horton – a Gunslinger
 Jewell Morgan as Golden Horde Guard #2
 Ralph Cookson as Wade Condon – a Gunslinger
 Betty Shay as Golden Horde Guard #3
 Del Monroe as Curt – Young Deserter
 Jan Lee as Golden Horde Guard #4
 Hugo Stanger as Jones – Older Deserter
 Nona Carver as Golden Horde Guard #5
 Joanne Bowers as Yellow Gold
 Ramona Rogers as Golden Horde Guard #6
 Pat O'Connell as Golden Horde Guard #1

Image gallery

Reception 
In a retrospective review 2015, Film Blitz scored it a C+ writing "Great exploitation title, and the film wastes absolutely no time [...] However, its true nature then becomes apparent. This is a straightforward Western, into which nudie - okay, toplessie - content has occasionally been spliced." and that "one can only imagine the surprise the actors in the main thread must have felt on seeing the finished product."

Travis Mills of Running Wild Films wrote in 2019 that "The film is on one hand ridiculous and cheap; on the other, it's far better than I could ever imagine it to be." and "What makes this part-nudie Western worth watching is its simple plot and execution." He concluded that "I would honestly take another one like this over the bloated flashy big-budget Westerns of today".

A review on The Movie Scene was less favorable, stating about the subplot of the tribe that "I honestly can't come up with a single word of praise when it comes to this side of the movie". It further said that "What this all boils down to is that Revenge of the Virgins is as poor as it sounds and in all honesty I wonder if the movie was just away of getting some attractive women to do a topless tribal dance as that seems to be the longest unedited scene in the entire movie."

References

External links 

 
 
 Revenge of the Virgins at Turner Classic Movies
 Revenge of the Virgins on YouTube

1959 films
American black-and-white films
Films about Native Americans
Films with screenplays by Ed Wood
1950s English-language films